Claude M. Johnson (December 1, 1852 – March 21, 1919) was a United States printer who was Director of the Bureau of Engraving and Printing from 1893 to 1900.

Biography

Claude M. Johnson was born in Lexington, Kentucky in 1852.  He attended school in Lexington and Rochester, New York.

After school, Johnson returned to Lexington and worked in the grocery and drug business.  He was elected to the Lexington city council and then went on to serve as mayor of Lexington from 1880 to 1888.

Johnson had a long-standing relationship with fellow Kentuckian John G. Carlisle.  When Carlisle became United States Secretary of the Treasury in 1893, he appointed Johnson Director of the Bureau of Engraving and Printing.  He held this office until 1900.

After leaving government service, Johnson worked as an Indian agent in Arizona.  He then moved to London and headed a printing company there.

Johnson died in Lexington in 1919 at age 66.

References

1852 births
1919 deaths
United States Department of the Treasury officials
Kentucky city council members
Mayors of Lexington, Kentucky
19th-century American politicians
Cleveland administration personnel